James W. Murphy (born July 2, 1936) is a former American soccer player who was a member of the St. Louis Kutis in the mid-1950s.  He earned two caps, scoring one goal, with the United States national team in 1957.

In 1957, Kutis won the National Challenge Cup.  Consequently, the United States Soccer Federation replaced the U.S. national team with the Kutis club in the middle of the 1958 FIFA World Cup qualification campaign.  Kutis, acting as the U.S. national team, lost two games to Canada and the U.S. had failed to qualify for a second straight Cup final.  However, Murphy scored 3–2 loss on July 6, 1957.  He was inducted into the St. Louis Soccer Hall of Fame in 1989.

In 1989 he was elected Sheriff of St. Louis.

References

1936 births
Living people
Place of birth missing (living people)
American soccer players
Association footballers not categorized by position
St. Louis Kutis players
United States men's international soccer players
American police officers
American law enforcement officials